Abalama, Nigeria is a settlement 15 km southwest of Port Harcourt. It was established in 1880 by members of Elem Abalama. The settlement has grown to become a middle town of the Kalabari people in Rivers State of Nigeria.

Geography
Abalama is situated on Abalama Island, along Abalama Creek, in the Asari-Toru Local Government Area in Rivers State, Nigeria. Like many areas in the Delta, water pollution is a problem.

References

Towns in Rivers State